Maj-Lis Lööw (born 13 August 1936) is a former social democrat politician who served as the minister of immigration and minister of gender equality between 1989 and 1991 in the cabinets of Prime Minister Ingvar Carlsson. She was also a member of the Swedish Parliament and the European Parliament.

Biography
Lööw was born in Eskilstuna on 13 August 1936. She was a member of the Social Democratic Party and the chair of the Social Democratic Women in Sweden in the period 1981–1990. She served at the Swedish Parliament for the Social Democratic Party between 1979 and 1995. In January 1989 Lööw was appointed minister of immigration, replacing Bo Görannson in the post. In the same period Lööw was also the minister of gender equality. She resigned from the Swedish Parliament in 1995 and served at the European Parliament as part of the Party of European Socialists of which she was vice president from 1995 and 1997. Her term at the European Parliament ended in 1999.

References

External links

20th-century Swedish women politicians
21st-century Swedish women
1936 births
Living people
Members of the Riksdag 1985–1988
Members of the Riksdag 1979–1982
Members of the Riksdag 1982–1985
Members of the Riksdag 1988–1991
Members of the Riksdag 1991–1994
Members of the Riksdag from the Social Democrats
MEPs for Sweden 1995–1999
People from Eskilstuna
Swedish Ministers for Gender Equality
Women government ministers of Sweden
Women members of the Riksdag